Mickael Turtle (A.K.A. Mickael the Turtle) from New Caledonia (France) is a fictional turtle who reached #5 in the French music charts with a reworking of the Ghostbusters theme. He has also made a teaser video (Wacky Animals).

Discography

Singles

Appearances
 2006 Wacky Animals (Universal, 0602498360262), published in Ukraine

References

External links
Information on Mickael Turtle's "Ghostbusters" single release
Video of "Ghostbusters"by Mickael Turtle
The motion graphics studio who created the video clip
 His Website

Fictional turtles